A Royal Review of Serving Yeomanry Regiments & Yeomanry Old Comrades by Her Majesty The Queen on the Occasion of the 200th Anniversary of the formation of the Yeomanry at Poets Lawn, Windsor Great Park on Sunday 17 April 1994.

Inspection party 

HER MAJESTY THE QUEEN
Colonel Commandant of the Yeomanry - Colonel Sir Ralph Carr-Ellison TD
Ceremonial Mounted Escort Commander - Captain W D Peck (The Royal Wessex Yeomanry)
Parade Adjutant - Lt.Col. J R Arkell TD (The Royal Yeomanry)
Parade Corporal Major - W01 D P Evans (The Life Guards) RCM (The Royal Yeomanry)
Parade Chaplain - The Reverend Alan Hughes CF TD
Director of Music - Major R J Parker FTCL ARCM (The Royal Yeomanry)

Yeomanry Titles On Parade